"Don't Stand So Close to Me" is a hit song by the rock band the Police, released in September 1980 as the lead single from their third album Zenyatta Mondatta. It concerns a teacher who has a sexual relationship with a student, which in turn is discovered.

The band's third  on the UK Singles Chart, it was also the best selling single of 1980 in the UK selling 808,000 copies in 1980 alone. The song also charted in the top ten in Australia, Canada and the US. The Police won the 1982 Grammy Award for Best Rock Performance by a Duo or Group with Vocal for this song.

Background
The music and lyrics of the song were written by the lead singer of the Police, Sting. The song deals with the mixed feelings of lust, fear and guilt that a school teacher has for a student and the fallout when the inappropriate relationship is discovered by other adults. The line "Just like the old man in that book by Nabokov" alludes to Vladimir Nabokov's novel Lolita, which covers somewhat similar issues. The line was criticised for rhyming "shake and cough" with Nabokov. Sting replied, "I've used that terrible, terrible rhyme technique a few times."

Before joining the Police, Sting had previously worked as an English teacher. He referred to the song's story progression as "the teacher, the open page, the virgin, the rape in the car, getting the sack."

In 1993, however, he said of the song's inspiration, "You have to remember we were blond bombshells at the time and most of our fans were young girls so I started roleplaying a bit. Let's exploit that."  He also stated that the song does not have a basis in fact, stating that "To be frank, it was right in our market. A lot of teenage girls were buying our records. So the idea was, let's write a Lolita story." In a 2001 interview for the concert DVD ...All This Time, Sting denied that the song is autobiographical.

Production 
"Don't Stand So Close to Me" appeared on the Police album Zenyatta Mondatta (A&M), and became a hit No. 1 UK single, along with a corresponding music video. In the US, it reached the top 10 on the Billboard Hot 100 chart, peaking at No. 10. In the UK, the track was confirmed by the end of 1980 to have been the biggest selling single of that year.

The B-side, "Friends", was written by Andy Summers and is inspired by Stranger in a Strange Land, a science fiction novel by Robert A. Heinlein. Summers described the track as "Very quirky. A touch of Long John Silver on Acid."

Sting was asked to perform on Mark Knopfler's "Money for Nothing" as he was in Montserrat at the time, and accidentally reused the melody from "Don't Stand So Close to Me" in the counterpoint lyric "I want my MTV." It was only after this story was relayed to reporters during promotions for the Brothers in Arms album that lawyers for Sting became involved, and later copies of the album co-credit the song to Sting. The initial pressings list only Knopfler.

Composition
"Don't Stand So Close to Me" features Sting on lead vocals. Like many Police songs, the verses are more subdued, while the chorus is bolder and louder. The song also bears a reggae style, yet another common trait in Police songs. 

The track uses a guitar synthesizer in the middle of the song, which was used by guitarist Andy Summers. Summers said, "After Sting had put the vocals on 'Don't Stand So Close To Me' we looked for something to lift the middle of the song. I came up with a guitar synthesiser. It was the first time we'd used it. I felt it worked really well." The verses and choruses do not feature this effect.

The verses are in the key of G minor, and the chorus is in D major.

Record World said it has "ingenious percussion, arrangement and hook."

Track listing
7-inch – A&M / AMS 7564 (UK)
 "Don't Stand So Close to Me" – 4:03
 "Friends" – 3:37

7-inch – A&M / AMS 2301 (US)
 "Don't Stand So Close to Me" – 4:03
 "A Sermon" – 2:34

Personnel
Sting – lead and backing vocals, bass guitar, bass pedals
Andy Summers – guitars, guitar synthesizer
Stewart Copeland – drums

Chart history

Weekly charts

Year-end charts

Certifications and sales

UK chart history 
It was also their third UK chart-topper in 12 months—in tandem with the  success of their new album Zenyatta Mondatta.

"Don't Stand So Close To Me" spent a total of 8 weeks inside the UK top 40, dropping out on 22 November.

US chart history 
It dropped out of the top 40 on 23 May after a 13-week run.

Legacy 
During the 2020 COVID-19 pandemic, "Don't Stand So Close To Me" took on a very different meaning in the context of COVID-19, as people worldwide practiced social distancing.

"Don't Stand So Close to Me '86"

The song was re-recorded in 1986 with a new, brooding arrangement, a different chorus and a more opulent production. The new version appeared as "Don't Stand So Close to Me '86" on the album Every Breath You Take: The Singles, and was released as a single, reaching  in the British charts.

Because of the decrease in tempo, a slight lyric change is found in the line "Just like the old man in that book by Nabokov" (the word 'famous' was added). A new music video was produced for the reworked song by Godley and Creme, notable for its early use of animated computer graphics.  The version of the song used on the music video was subtly different to the version released as the single.  It was approximately 6 seconds shorter, with a longer atmospheric break before the first lyric, but part of the chorus edited out towards the end.  This version is only available on the music video; it has never been separately released as an audio recording.

Because drummer Stewart Copeland had broken his collarbone and was unable to drum, he opted to use his Fairlight CMI to program the drum track for the single, while singer/bassist Sting pushed to use the drums on his Synclavier instead. The group's engineer found the Synclavier's programming interface difficult; it ended up taking him two days to complete the task. Copeland ultimately finished the drum programming and claimed that the Fairlight's then-legendary "Page R" (the device's sequencing page) saved his life and put him on the map as a composer. In a Qantas inflight radio program named "Reeling in the Years", Copeland was quoted as saying that the argument over Synclavier versus Fairlight drums was "the straw that broke the camel's back," and that this led to the group's unravelling.

As the Police had already disbanded by the time the 1986 single was released, this, aside from the then-unreleased "De Do Do Do, De Da Da Da '86," was the last recording before the band's reunion and the most recent studio recording the band has released.

Track listing
7-inch – A&M / AM 354 (UK)
 "Don't Stand So Close to Me '86" – 4:47
 "Don't Stand So Close to Me" (live) – 3:40

12-inch – A&M / AMY 354 (UK)
 "Don't Stand So Close to Me '86" (dance mix) – 6:32
 "Don't Stand So Close to Me '86" – 4:47
 "Don't Stand So Close to Me" (original version) – 4:03
 "Don't Stand So Close to Me" (live) – 3:40

Charts

Glee cover

The song was covered in the episode "Ballad" of the American television series Glee in 2009. It was performed by the character Will Schuester (played by Matthew Morrison) as a musical mashup with "Young Girl" by Gary Puckett & the Union Gap. It was included on the second soundtrack album from the series.

References

The Police songs
1980 singles
1981 singles
1986 singles
UK Singles Chart number-one singles
Sexuality and age in fiction
Songs about teenagers
Songs written by Sting (musician)
Song recordings produced by Nigel Gray
Songs about school
1980 songs
A&M Records singles
Columbia Records singles
Songs about educators